A food steamer or steam cooker is a small kitchen appliance used to cook or prepare various foods with steam heat by means of holding the food in a closed vessel reducing steam escape. This manner of cooking is called steaming.

History 

Food steamers have been used for centuries. The ancient Chinese used pottery steamers to cook food. Archaeological excavations have uncovered pottery cooking vessels known as yan steamers: a yan was composed of two vessels, a zeng with a perforated floor surmounted on a pot or caldron with a tripod base and a top cover. The earliest yan steamer dating from about 5000 BC was unearthed in the Banpo site. In the lower Yangzi River, zeng pots first appeared in the Hemudu culture (5000–4500 BC) and Liangzhu culture (3200–2000 BC) and were used to steam rice; yan steamers were also unearthed in several Liangzhu sites, including 3 found at the Chuodun and Luodun sites in southern Jiangsu. In the Longshan culture (3000–2000 BC) site at Tianwang in western Shandong, 3 large yan steamers were discovered.

Advantages

Most steam cookers also feature a juice catchment which allows all nutrients (otherwise lost as steam) to be consumed. When other cooking techniques are used (e.g., boiling), these nutrients are generally lost, as most are discarded after cooking.
 
Due to their health aspect (cooking without any oil), food steamers are used extensively in health-oriented diets such as cuisine minceur, some raw food diets, the Okinawa diet, a macrobiotic diet, or the CRON-diet.

Food steamers release less heat to the kitchen environment, therefore helping keep the kitchen cool during hot summers.

See also

 Food processing
 List of cooking appliances
 List of cooking vessels
 List of steamed foods
 Bamboo steamer
 Pressure cooking
 Rice cooker, a cooking appliance that may have a food steaming capability
 Siru, earthenware steamer

References

Ancient inventions
Chinese inventions
Cooking appliances
Cooking vessels
Food preparation appliances